The Palmetto Mountains are a mountain range in Esmeralda County, Nevada. The Lida Mining District and Lida, Nevada are located in the range.

The mountains are east of the Sylvania Mountains and north of the Slate Range and Death Valley.  It is a sub-range of the Silver Peak Range further northwest.  Blue Dick Benchmark, at 9,289 ft above sea level, is the highest point of the Palmettos.

References 

Mountain ranges of Nevada
Mountain ranges of Esmeralda County, Nevada
Mountain ranges of the Great Basin